Jimmy Thompson (born 26 November 1935) is an English former professional footballer who played as a wing half.

Career
Born in Oldham, Lancashire, Thompson played for Chadderton, Oldham Athletic, Exeter City, Rochdale, Bradford City and Buxton.

References

1935 births
Living people
English footballers
Footballers from Oldham
Chadderton F.C. players
Oldham Athletic A.F.C. players
Exeter City F.C. players
Rochdale A.F.C. players
Bradford City A.F.C. players
Buxton F.C. players
English Football League players
Association football midfielders